Hoseynabad-e Chahar (also Romanized as Ḩoseynābād-e Chahar; also known as Ḩoseynābād) is a village in Javar Rural District in the Central District of Kuhbanan County, Kerman Province, Iran. It appeared in the 2006 census but its population was not reported.

References 

Populated places in Kuhbanan County